George Phillips may refer to:

Military
 George Phillips (USMC) (1926–1945), US Marine and Medal of Honor recipient
 George Frederick Phillips (1862–1904), Spanish–American War Medal of Honor recipient

Politics
 George Phillips (Australian politician) (1843–1921), surveyor and member of the Queensland Legislative Assembly
 George Lort Phillips (1811–1866), British member of parliament

Religion
 George Phillips (Watertown) (died 1644), seventeenth-century American religious leader and founder of Watertown, Massachusetts
 George Phillips (orientalist) (1804–1892), English churchman, orientalist and mathematician
 George Phillips (priest), archdeacon in the Diocese of Rupert's Land

Other
 George Phillips (canon lawyer) (1804–1872), German canon lawyer
 George Phillips (American football) (1921–1994), American football player
 George Bagster Phillips (1835–1897), London police surgeon
 G. Godfrey Phillips (1900–1965), British barrister and the Commissioner General of the Shanghai Municipal Council

See also
 George Philips (disambiguation)
 George Philip (disambiguation)